Little Goguryeo (alternatively Lesser Goguryeo, Little Gaogouli or Lesser Gaogouli) is the name of a state thought to have existed on the Liaodong Peninsula, proposed by the Japanese scholar Kaizaburo Hino (:ja:日野開三郎). The existence of the state is debated among scholars. The state was mentioned in historical records, with its leaders recorded as Governors-General subject to the Tang dynasty in the documents of the Tang government. It was supposedly established by the refugees of Goguryeo (Gaogouli) after its defeat by the Tang dynasty.

Following Gorguryeo's destruction by the Tang–Silla alliance, the Liaodong Peninsula was administered by the Tang dynasty. The theory is that the Tang dynasty eventually lost effective control of the region due to rebellions staged by Goguryeo refugees, and Liaodong became a buffer zone between the Tang dynasty and Balhae (Bohai). Although Lesser Goguryeo declared itself an independent kingdom, it was soon absorbed into Balhae.

Establishment
In 699, the Tang government sent former Goguryeo prince Go Deokmu, the third son of Goguryeo's last ruler, King Bojang, to Liaodong Peninsula, naming him "King of Chaoxian" and Governor of the Yodong Commandery of the Protectorate General to Pacify the East. Like his father, Go Deokmu had plans to rebel against the Tang, to revive Goguryeo and to provide a kingdom for the Goguryeo people.

The Tang Empire at the time was undergoing several crises, especially the An Lushan Rebellion. Along with these major events was also the pressure given by the Empire of Balhae. These and many other pressures allowed Go Deokmu to take full control of the Protectorate General to Pacify the East and allegedly to establish a kingdom.

The Little Goguryeo kingdom was established during that year with Go Deokmu as its first king. Very little is known about how the neighboring kingdoms reacted to the establishment of Little Goguryeo. It tis known that Balhae was on good terms with Lesser Goguryeo with respect to the similar purposes that the two kingdoms possessed.

Fall
At around 820, after two generations of ruling the Liaodong Peninsula and other former regions of Goguryeo, Lesser Goguryeo was absorbed into Balhae during the reign King Seon of Balhae.

See also 
 Goguryeo
 Balhae
 Protectorate General to Pacify the East
 Go Deokmu

References

Goguryeo
History of Manchuria
History of Korea
Former countries in Chinese history
Former countries in Korean history
Former countries in East Asia
Former monarchies of East Asia
699 establishments